Viktor Vasylyovych Moroz (born 18 January 1968, in Soviet Union) is a Ukrainian professional football coach and a former player. In 2005, he manages the Ukraine national beach soccer team. He made his professional debut in the Soviet Second League in 1986 for FC Dynamo Kyiv.

Honours
 Soviet Top League champion: 1990.

References

1968 births
Living people
Soviet footballers
Ukrainian footballers
Ukrainian football managers
FC Dynamo Kyiv players
Hapoel Be'er Sheva F.C. players
Maccabi Tel Aviv F.C. players
Hapoel Tzafririm Holon F.C. players
FC CSKA Kyiv players
Liaoning F.C. players
Expatriate footballers in Israel
Expatriate footballers in China
FC Volyn Lutsk managers
Liga Leumit players
Footballers from Kyiv
Association football defenders
Ukrainian expatriate footballers
Ukrainian expatriate sportspeople in Israel
Ukrainian expatriate sportspeople in China